The Hispaniolan curlytail lizard (Leiocephalus schreibersii), also known as the Hispaniolan khaki curlytail, the red-sided curlytail lizard, the red-sided curly-tailed lizard, or Schreibers's curly-tailed lizard, is a common lizard species in the family Leiocephalidae. It is native to Hispaniola (in both Haiti and the Dominican Republic) in the Caribbean, and an introduced population is found in southern Florida. There are two recognized subspecies.

Taxonomy

Etymology
The specific name, schreibersi, is in honor of Austrian naturalist Carl Franz Anton Ritter von Schreibers.

Subspecies
Including the nominotypical subspecies, two subspecies are recognized as being valid.
Leiocephalus schreibersii nesomorus 
Leiocephalus schreibersii schreibersii 

Nota bene: A trinomial authority in parentheses indicates that the subspecies was originally described in a genus other than Leiocephalus.

Distribution and habitat
L. schreibersii is indigenous to the main island of Hispaniola (the Dominican Republic and Haiti), and Île de la Tortue. It is also found in Florida as an introduced species.

Life cycle and behavior
L. schreibersii is oviparous.

L. schreibersii is active during the day. It feeds mainly on insects.

References

Further reading
Boulenger GA (1885). Catalogue of the Lizards in the British Museum (Natural History). Second Edition. Volume II. Iguanidæ ... London: Trustees of the British Museum (Natural History). (Taylor and Francis, printers). xiii + 497 pp. + Plates I-XXIV. ("Liocephalus [sic] schreibersii ", pp. 162–163).
Gravenhorst JLC (1837). "Beiträge zur genaueren Kenntniss einiger Eidechsengattungen ". Verhandlungen der Kaiserlichen Leopoldinisch-Carolinischen Akademie der Naturforscher / Nova Acta Physico-Medica Academiae Caesareae Leopoldino-Carolinae Naturae Curiosorum 18: 712-784. (Pristonotus schreibersii, new species, pp. 739–742 + Plate LIV, figures 15, 16). (in German).
Schwartz A (1968). "The Leiocephalus (Lacertilia, Iguanidae) of Hispaniola. III. Leiocephalus screibersi [sic], L. semilineatus, and L. pratensis ". Journal of Herpetology 1 (1-4): 39-63. (Leiocephalus schreibersi [sic] nesomorus, new subspecies, p. 47).

Leiocephalus
Reptiles described in 1837
Reptiles of the Dominican Republic
Reptiles of Haiti
Endemic fauna of Hispaniola
Taxa named by Johann Ludwig Christian Gravenhorst